Bernard "Benny" Dargle (born 2 January 1957) is an American retired professional soccer player who played as a defender, making over 400 career appearances in a professional career which lasted from 1978 to 1992.

Career
Dargle was born in Liverpool, England and played college soccer for the University of Akron from 1975 to 1977.  He began his pro-career in 1978 with the Cleveland Cobras of the American Soccer League before moving to the Detroit Express of the North American Soccer League in 1979.  He played two outdoor seasons and one indoor season with the Express before moving to the Washington Diplomats in 1981.  The Dips folded at the end of the season and on October 6, 1981, the Seattle Sounders selected Dargle first in the dispersal draft.  He finished his NASL career with the Sounders in 1983.  When the Sounders folded at the end of the 1983 season, the Vancouver Whitecaps selected Dargle in the dispersal draft, but he did not sign with that team.  Instead, he turned to indoor soccer with the Cleveland Force of the Major Indoor Soccer League with whom he played five seasons.  On June 16, 1988, the Force released Dargle, along with several other players, as the team folded.  Dargle remained in Cleveland after no other MISL team signed him.  In the summer of 1989, Dargle was signed by the expansion Cleveland Crunch after a successful trial.  On June 20, 1990, Dargle became a free agent when the Crunch allowed his contract to lapse.  He then moved to the Canton Invaders of the American Indoor Soccer Association.  He became the head coach during the 1990-1991 season and remained so until resigning in July 1992.   He continued to play until the end of the 1992-1993 season.  In January 1996, he returned to the Invaders on a fifteen-day contract.

References

External links
 NASL/MISL career stats
 Seattle Sounders Museum

1957 births
Living people
Footballers from Liverpool
Akron Zips men's soccer players
American Indoor Soccer Association coaches
American Indoor Soccer Association players
American soccer coaches
American soccer players
American Soccer League (1933–1983) players
Canton Invaders players
Cleveland Crunch players
Cleveland Cobras players
Cleveland Force (original MISL) players
Detroit Express players
North American Soccer League (1968–1984) indoor players
National Professional Soccer League (1984–2001) players
North American Soccer League (1968–1984) players
Major Indoor Soccer League (1978–1992) players
Seattle Sounders (1974–1983) players
Washington Diplomats (NASL) players
Association football defenders
English expatriate sportspeople in the United States
Expatriate soccer players in the United States
English expatriate footballers